Sunday Costs Five Pesos is a 1957 Australian television film based on the one-act stage play of the same name by Josefina Niggli. Aired live in Melbourne, it was a comedy set in Mexico.

A kinescope recording was made of the broadcast and shown in Sydney at a later date. These were the only two cities in Australia with television at the time. Duration of the television play was approximately 30 minutes, and aired on ABC.

It was one of the first comedies produced for Australian television, which had begun less than a year earlier.

Plot
A Mexican woman deals with an unfaithful lover.

Cast
Guy Le Claire 
Melpo Zaracosta (a Greek actor who had moved to Australia)
Brenda Senders 
Audrey Teasdale 
Joan Landor

See also
List of live television plays broadcast on Australian Broadcasting Corporation (1950s)

References

External links
Sunday Costs Five Pesos on IMDb

1957 television plays
1950s Australian television plays
Australian Broadcasting Corporation original programming
English-language television shows
Black-and-white Australian television shows
Australian live television shows
Plays set in Mexico